Giorgio Kutufà (10 April 1948 – 13 May 2020) was an Italian politician who served as the President of the Province of Livorno from 13 June 2004 to 14 October 2014. He also served in the Regional Council of Tuscany from 1985 to 1995.

Biography
Giorgio Kutufà was born and raised in Livorno. He studied economics and commerce at the University of Pisa. Kutufà returned to the university as a member of the Faculty of Economics later in his life.

Kutufà was first elected to the Livorno municipal council in 1970, where he served from 1970 to 1985 as a member of the Christian Democrats (DC). He was then elected to the Regional Council of Tuscany from 1985 to 1995. Following the dissolution of the Christian Democratic (DC) party in 1994, Kutufà became a co-founder of Toscana Democratica.

Kutufà served as President of the Province of Livorno for two terms from 13 June 2004 to 14 October 2014. He became provincial President in 2004 when his center left coalition comprising Democrats of the Left, The Daisy, Party of Italian Communists, Federation of the Greens, and the Italian Democratic Socialists, captured 59.3% of the vote in the June 2004 election.

In 2009, Giorgio Kutufà won a second term as President of the Province of Livorno when his new center-left coalition, this time supported by the Democratic Party, Italy of Values and Left Ecology Freedom parties, won 54.4% of the vote in the 6-7 June election.

Giorgio Kutufà died from a long illness on 13 May 2020 at the age of 72. He was survived by his wife, Daniela, and two children, Ilaria and Luigi.

References

1948 births
2020 deaths
Presidents of the Province of Livorno
Members of the Regional Council of Tuscany
Democratic Party (Italy) politicians
Christian Democracy (Italy) politicians
Academic staff of the University of Pisa
University of Pisa alumni
People from Livorno